Mittal Patel (born ) is an Indian activist from Gujarat. After her studies, she began to help people from indigenous tribes to integrate into society. In recognition of her work, she was awarded the Nari Shakti Puraskar in 2018.

Career
Patel was born  in Sankhalpur village, in the Mehsana district of Gujarat. Both her parents worked in animal husbandry. She married and had one daughter. She took a Ba in physics before studying journalism at Gujarat University in Ahmedabad, and then in 2006 began to work with indigenous peoples. Four years later, she founded Vicharta Samuday Samarthan Manch (VSSM), an organization dedicated to supporting nomads. She worked with the Bawa, Gadaliya, Kangasiya, Meer, Nathwadee, Salat and Saraniya tribes, helping people to get married, set up schools, assert land rights and claim identification papers. The Government of Gujarat had by 2016 issued 60,000 voting card to indigenous peoples. The VSSM acts as a bank, lending money to individuals and runs two hostels in Ahmedabad for over 700 children. Building upon the connections fostered by the VSSM, the Kalupur Co-operative Bank has given microfinance loans of Rs 50,000 to 100 indigenous peoples in order to buy housing and also issued loans of up to Rs 25,000 to small businesses.

Gujarat has 28 nomadic tribes and 12 denotified tribes. These tribes have traditionally worked as knife sharpeners, haberdashers, snake-charmers and rope-walkers.
Patel engaged with members of the Dafer commmunity, who were commonly regarded as criminals after being labelled as such under the British Raj. She worked to help them integrate into broader society. There are between 45 and 50 Dafer communities (known as Danga) in Gujarat, with a population of 18,000. By 2018, 90 per cent of the indigenous peoples of Gujarat had become citizens of India. However, Patel was still compelled to organize actions against lynch mobs which targeted tribal people. The following year, Patel was appointed to a board alongside Otaram Dewasi and under NITI Aayog which was intended to suggest welfare measures for indigenous peoples. In 2020, Patel published a book entitled Surnama vinana Maanvio. She has also revived more than 87 Gujarati lakes.

Awards and recognition
Patel's activism for human rights was recognised with the Nari Shakti Puraskar. She was presented with the award on International Women's Day, 8 March 2018, by President Ram Nath Kovind.

References

1980s births
Women from Gujarat
Nari Shakti Puraskar winners
Gujarat University alumni
Living people